Architextures is the second studio album by American jazz pianist Vijay Iyer recorded with eight musicians. The album was released on  via Asian Improv Records label. The tracks 3, 4, 7, 9 were recorded by a trio of Iyer, Brock, and Hargreaves. The tracks 2, 5, 6, 8, 10, 11 were recorded by an octet. The tracks 1 and 12 were recorded solo by Iyer.

Reception
Robert Spencer of All About Jazz stated: "Vijay Iyer is 'one of the most fascinating jazz pianists around,' says Berkeley's East Bay Express, and I couldn't have said it better myself. It is getting ever more difficult to hear someone with something really new to say, but Architextures should establish Vijay Iyer as a pianist to be reckoned with... Architextures amply rewards repeated listens and has made me, for one, make a note to look out for the man's next disc and even greater things to come."

David R. Adler of Allmusic noted: "As on his debut, 1995's Memorophilia, Iyer is after a sound that combines modern jazz with elements inspired by the South Asian diaspora of which he is a part. The clearest references to non-Western music appear on 'Three Peas,' which features Mahanthappa and the two bassists. Otherwise, Iyer's multifarious influences are harder to separate or even detect, as they're deeply interwoven within the dense stew of rhythms and improvisational dialogues undertaken by both ensembles. There's an opaque quality and a relentless intensity in much of Iyer's music. Pianistically, he has something in common with non-traditional players such as Jason Moran and Ethan Iverson (neither of whom were prominent at the time of this recording). As a composer, Iyer draws upon figures such as Andrew Hill, Cecil Taylor, and Steve Coleman, but he is clearly arriving at his own highly complex style."

Track listing

Personnel
Band
Vijay Iyer – liner notes, mixing, piano, producer
Jeff Brock – bass
Eric Crystal – sax (soprano), sax (tenor)
Liberty Ellman – guitar
Brad Hargreaves – drums
Aaron Stewart – sax (tenor)
Rudresh Mahanthappa – sax (alto)
Kevin Ellington Mingus – bass

Production
Matt Levine – mastering
Cookie Marenco – engineer, mixing

References

1998 albums
Vijay Iyer albums
ECM Records albums
Albums produced by Manfred Eicher
Jazz albums by American artists